Francisco Salvador Elá (born 9 May 1980), commonly known as Chupe, is a former Equatoguinean professional footballer who played as a striker.

Club career
Born in Mongomo, Chupe spent 13 years as a senior in Spanish football safe for a very brief spell in Switzerland with FC Chiasso, but never competed in higher than Segunda División B. He spent several seasons associated with Real Madrid but only appeared officially with its C and B-teams, even though main squad manager Vicente del Bosque registered him in one UEFA Champions League list as a youth system player.

Other than the Merengues Chupe represented in the country AD Alcorcón, UD Las Palmas, UD Puertollano, Rayo Vallecano, CD Leganés, CD Vera de Almería, CD Binéfar, SD Noja (two spells) and SD Leioa. In 2012–13, at age 32, he made his debut as a professional, representing Kazincbarcikai SC in Hungary's second level.

In December 2013, after a brief trial in Cambodia with Phnom Penh Crown FC, Chupe moved to Hong Kong with Happy Valley AA.

International career
Chupe earned five caps for Equatorial Guinea, the first two coming in 2003 in the 2006 FIFA World Cup qualifiers against Togo. He made his debut on 11 October in the 1–0 home win in Bata (1–2 aggregate loss).

Personal life
Chupe's younger brother, Gregorio, was also a footballer. A defender, he spent his entire career in Spanish amateur football.

References

External links

 
HKFA profile

1980 births
Living people
People from Mongomo
Equatoguinean emigrants to Spain
Equatoguinean footballers
Association football forwards
Segunda División B players
Tercera División players
Real Madrid C footballers
AD Alcorcón footballers
Real Madrid Castilla footballers
UD Las Palmas players
CD Puertollano footballers
Rayo Vallecano players
CD Leganés players
CD Binéfar players
SD Leioa players
Swiss Challenge League players
FC Chiasso players
Kazincbarcikai SC footballers
Tai Po FC players
Singapore Premier League players
Hougang United FC players
Equatorial Guinea international footballers
Equatoguinean expatriate footballers
Expatriate footballers in Switzerland
Expatriate footballers in Hungary
Expatriate footballers in Hong Kong
Expatriate footballers in Laos
Expatriate footballers in Singapore
Expatriate footballers in Malta
Equatoguinean expatriate sportspeople in Switzerland
Equatoguinean expatriate sportspeople in Hungary
Equatoguinean expatriate sportspeople in Hong Kong
Equatoguinean expatriate sportspeople in Laos
Equatoguinean expatriate sportspeople in Singapore
Equatoguinean expatriate sportspeople in Malta